Cocaine is the thirteenth solo studio album by American rapper Z-Ro. It was released on October 27, 2009 via Rap-A-Lot Records, Asylum Records and Warner Bros. Records. Production was mostly handled by Z-Ro himself, alongside Bigg Tyme, Big E, and Beanz N Kornbread. It features guest appearances from Chris Ward, Lil' Flip, Big Pokey, Billy Cook, Gucci Mane, Lil' O and Mike D. The album peaked at number 147 on the Billboard 200 in the United States.

Track listing

Sample credits
"Intro" contains a sample of "Happiness" by Maze
"Don't Worry Bout Mine" contains an interpolation of "Summer Breeze" by The Isley Brothers
"That's the Type of Nigga I Am" contains a sample of "Sweet Dreams" by Air Supply
"I Don't Give a Damn" contains samples of "Street Life" by The Crusaders and "A Dream" by DeBarge
"Can't Leave Drank Alone" contains a sample of "Feenin'" by Jodeci
"Bring My Mail" contains a sample of "Ring My Bell" by Anita Ward

Charts

References

External links

2009 albums
Z-Ro albums
Albums produced by Z-Ro